National Route 345 is a national highway of Japan connecting Chūō-ku, Niigata and Yuza, Yamagata in Japan, with a total length of .

History
National Route 345 was established on 1 April 1975 as a route connecting Murakami, Niigata and Yuza, Yamagata.

On 19 June 2019, Route 345 was blocked by fallen debris in Murakami, Niigata because of the 2019 Yamagata earthquake.

References

National highways in Japan
Roads in Niigata Prefecture
Roads in Yamagata Prefecture